Brecon Rugby Football Club is a rugby union club from the town of Brecon, Mid Wales. The club is a member of the Welsh Rugby Union and is a feeder club for Cardiff Rugby.

The club was one of the eleven founding members of the Welsh Rugby Union in 1881. Brecon, along with Pontypool, Llandovery College, Lampeter College, Llandeilo and Merthyr inaugurated the South Wales Cup competition in the 1877-78 season.

The first recorded match with a Brecon rugby team first appeared on 9 November 1867 in "The Brecon County Times" where a Town team from Brecon lost 2-0 to Christ's College, Brecon on 6 November 1867.

An ad appeared on 24 October 1868, in The Brecon County Times, stating the formation of a new club in the town, playing their inaugural match on 21/10/1868 on the cricket field, with the captain's side beating the secretaries side. Their kit for the match was "white Jerseys bound with green, and a fleur-de-lis on the left side". There was no name of the new club mentioned.
On 9 January 1869, another team was formed in Brecon, called "The United Rangers".

Club honours
 2018-19 WRU Plate - Winners

Past players of note

  Edward Perkins Alexander
  Bill Clement
  Dewi Morris
  Andy Powell
  George Ruddick
  Richard Garnons Williams
  Mark Wyatt

References

External links
 Brecon Rugby Football Club

Rugby clubs established in 1879
Welsh rugby union teams
Brecon
Sport in Powys